Washington Agreement or Washington Accords  may refer to:

 Washington Agreement (1994), peace agreement of Bosnia and Herzegovina (March 1 1994)
 Washington Accords (1942), the Brazil-United States Political-Military Agreement leading to Brazil entering World War II
 Washington Accord (Kargil War), in 1999 involved India and Pakistan
 Washington Accord (credentials), an international accreditation agreement for undergraduate professional engineering academic degrees
 Washington Agreement on Gold,  The Washington Central Banks Agreement on Gold (26 September 1999)
 Anglo-American Petroleum Agreement or Washington Agreement, a failed attempt by the British and American governments to establish a lasting agreement to manage international petroleum supply and demand (1944)
 Kosovo and Serbia economic normalization agreements (2020) or the Washington Agreement, a pair of documents in which Kosovo and Serbia agreed to facilitate economic normalization (September 4 2020)

See also 
 Washington Declaration (disambiguation)
 Washington Naval Conference of 1922, a disarmament conference resulting in three treaties:
 Four-Power Treaty, of 1922 
 Five-Power Treaty of 1922, commonly known as the Washington Naval Treaty
 Nine-Power Treaty, of 1922
 G8+5, an international group that consisted of the leaders of 13 developed nations or emerging economies